OVS may refer to:

 Object–verb–subject, a rare permutation of word order in linguistic typology
 Ojai Valley School, a boarding school in southern California, U.S.A
 Online Video Studio, an organization that works with different video platforms
 Open vSwitch, an open-source distributed virtual multilayer network switch 
 Orange Free State, the historical precursor to the present-day Free State province (Afrikaans: Oranje-Vrijstaat)
 Free State Province, a present-day province in South Africa that was called the Orange Free State in 1994-1995 (Afrikaans: Oranje-Vrijstaat)
 Orchard View Schools, a school district in the U.S. state of Michigan
 OVS (gang), a Mexican American (Chicano) family from Ontario, CA
 OVS (company), an Italian clothing company